Antonio Francisco Javier José Soler Ramos, usually known as Padre ('Father', in the religious sense) Antonio Soler, known in Catalan as Antoni Soler i Ramos (baptized 3 December 1729 – died 20 December 1783) was a Spanish composer whose works span the late Baroque and early Classical music eras. He is best known for his many mostly one-movement keyboard sonatas.

Early life and training
Soler was born in Olot (Catalonia, Spain) in the County of Besalú. In 1736, when he was six, he entered the Escolania of the Monastery of Montserrat where he studied music with the resident mestre Benet Esteve and organist Benet Valls. In 1746, when he was only 17, he was appointed Kapellmeister in Lleida, and some sources say he also exercised that position at La Seu d'Urgell. In 1752, when he was 23, he moved to Castile, having been admitted to the Monastery of San Lorenzo del Escorial for his talents as a composer and organist. His fame soon led Domenico Scarlatti and José de Nebra to accept him as a student, completing his high-level training there.

Life at El Escorial Monastery and Royal Court 
Soler entered the monastery as a novice in 1752, at the age of 23, and took holy orders a year later, embarking on a busy routine as a Hieronymite at El Escorial (near Madrid). There he studied under José de Nebra and (according to some sources) Domenico Scarlatti, before teaching in his own right. He was appointed music teacher for the Infantes Antonio and Gabriel, sons of Carlos III.

While there, he was known to have 20-hour workdays, in the course of which he produced more than 500 compositions.  Among these were around 150 keyboard sonatas, many believed to have been written for his pupil, the Infante Don Gabriel, a son of King Carlos III.  Other pieces include Christmas villancicos and Catholic liturgical music, including Masses. He died in the monastery of San Lorenzo del Escorial.

Compositions
Padre Soler's most celebrated works are his keyboard sonatas, which are comparable to those composed by Domenico Scarlatti (with whom he may have studied) but are more varied in form than those of Scarlatti, with some pieces in three or four movements; Scarlatti's pieces are in one (mostly) or two movements. Soler's sonatas were cataloged in the early twentieth century by Fr. Samuel Rubio and so all have 'R' numbers assigned.

Soler also composed concertos, quintets for organ and strings, motets, masses and pieces for solo organ. He also wrote a treatise, Llave de la modulación ("The Key to Modulation", 1762).

Soler's Six Concertos for Two Organs are still very much in the repertoire and have often been recorded. A fandango authored by Soler, and probably more often performed than any other work of his, is claimed by some to be of doubtful authorship..

Selected discography

Works solely by Soler
 Soler: Complete Sonatas played by harpsichordist Pieter-Jan Belder. Brilliant Classics
 Soler: Sonatas,Fandango, Concerto pour deux Clavecins. played by Rafael Puyana and Genoveva Gálvez. Philips
 Soler: 8 Sonatas, Fandango. Played by harpsichordist . Passacaille 943
 Soler: Fandango, 9 Sonatas. Played by harpsichordist Scott Ross. Erato
 Soler: Fandango & Sonatas. Played by harpsichordist David Schrader. Cedille 004
 Soler: Harpsichord Sonatas, vol. II. Played by harpsichordist David Schrader. Cedille 009
 Soler: Sonatas. Played by pianist Elena Riu. Ensayo 9818
 Soler: Complete Harpsichord Works.  Played by Bob van Asperen (12 disks). Astrée
 Soler: Sonatas para piano. Played by pianist Alicia de Larrocha. EMI CLASSICS
 Soler: Los 6 Quintetos para clave y cuerda. Played by harpsichordist Genoveva Gálvez and the string quartet Agrupación Nacional de Música de Cámara. EMI CLASSICS
 Soler: Sonatas for Harpsichord. Played by Gilbert Rowland. A multi-volume project on Naxos Records.
 Soler: Six Concertos for Two Keyboard Instruments.  Played by Kenneth Gilbert and Trevor Pinnock. Archiv Produktion 453171-2
 Soler: Six Concertos for Two Organs. Played by Mathot and Koopman.  Warner WEA/Atlantic/Erato ZK45741
 Soler: Six Concertos for Two Organs. Played by E. Power Biggs (Flentrop organ on the left) and Daniel Pinkham (Hess organ on the right).  Recorded at the Busch-Reisinger Museum, Harvard University, 1961. LP: Columbia Masterworks Stereo MS 6208 (Library of Congress catalog card number R60-1383)
 Soler: 19 Sonatas. Played by Anna Malikova. Classical Records CR-049
 Soler: Keyboard Sonatas and the "Fandango". Played by Maggie Cole. Virgin Classics
 Soler: 13 Sonatas. Played by pianist Marie-Luise Hinrichs. Warner Classics.
 Padre Soler: Sonates pour Clavier. Played by pianist Luis Fernando Pérez. Mirare.

Works by Soler & other composers
Favourite Spanish Encores. Played by pianist Alicia de Larrocha with Rafael Frühbeck de Burgos conducting the Royal Philharmonic Orchestra. London/Decca Legends 467687
Grandes Pianistas Españoles. Played by pianist Alicia de Larrocha. Rtve 65235
Piano Español. Played by pianist Jorge Federico Osorio. Cedille 075
Soler: Keyboard Sonatas Nos. 1-15. Played by pianist Martina Filjak.  Naxos 8.572515

References

 Soler, Antonio (Father)
 The Life and Times of Soler (includes audio and sheet music of Soler's keyboard works)

External links

 
 
 All sonatas (free scores)
 
  List of Soler's sonatas in the order of original sources
 List of Soler's sonatas in the order of original sources (Internet Archive)

1729 births
1783 deaths
18th-century classical composers
18th-century male musicians
18th-century Spanish Roman Catholic priests
Catholic liturgical composers
Composers for harpsichord
Composers for pipe organ
Composers from Catalonia
Hieronymites
People from Olot
Spanish Baroque composers
Spanish Classical-period composers
Spanish male classical composers
Spanish music theorists